Garra jordanica is a species of ray-finned fish in the family Cyprinidae. Populations in the coastal rivers of Kishon, Daliyya and Taninnim have not been studied in detail, but may also be this species. In the past all these populations were included in G. rufa. Since the "G. rufa" seen in the aquarium and spa trade mostly are of Israeli origin, this leads to questions over their true identity. In the southern Dead Sea basin G. jordanica is replaced by the much rarer G. ghorensis.

References

Fish described in 2014
Cyprinid fish of Asia
Garra